Four Points Media Group was a holding company owned by Cerberus Capital Management, established in 2007 to serve as a buyer for 7 television stations formerly owned by CBS Corporation.

The company took over the day-to-day operations of the stations via local marketing agreements on June 25. The acquisition of the stations was granted FCC approval on November 21, 2007, and closed on January 10, 2008.

KUTV, the CBS affiliate in Salt Lake City, served as the master-control hub facility for Four Points' stations. As such, it served as the "flagship" station of the group. KEYE-TV in Austin, Texas, the other CBS affiliate owned by Four Points, was the only station not controlled by the KUTV hub facility.

On March 20, 2009, Four Points reached an agreement with Nexstar Broadcasting Group to take over operations of the stations through local service agreements (LSAs).

On September 8, 2011, Sinclair Broadcast Group announced its intent to purchase Four Points Media Group from Cerberus Capital Management for $200 million. Sinclair began managing the stations in October 2011 through time brokerage agreements and would supply working capital to the stations in consideration of service fees and performance incentives through the LMAs, prior to closing of the acquisition. The deal was approved by the Federal Communications Commission (FCC) on December 21, and closed on January 1, 2012.

Stations
Stations are arranged alphabetically by state and by city of license.

References

American companies established in 2007
2007 establishments in Utah
Companies disestablished in 2012
Mass media companies disestablished in 2012
Companies based in Salt Lake City
2012 mergers and acquisitions
Defunct television broadcasting companies of the United States
Sinclair Broadcast Group